Goggins is an unincorporated community in Lamar County, in the U.S. state of Georgia.

History
Variant names have been "Goggans", "Goggans Station", "Goggansville", "Goggins Station", and "Gogginsville". A post office called Goggansville was established in 1875, and remained in operation until 1927. The community was named after the Goggins family, original owners of the town site.

References

Unincorporated communities in Lamar County, Georgia